Fred M. MacLean (July 9, 1898 – June 3, 1976) was an American set decorator. He was nominated for three Academy Awards in the category Best Art Direction. He worked on 60 films between 1941 and 1965. He was born in North Dakota and died in Los Angeles, California.

Selected filmography
MacLean was nominated for three Academy Awards for Best Art Direction:
 Sergeant York (1941)
 The Adventures of Mark Twain (1944)
 The Greatest Story Ever Told (1965)

References

External links

1898 births
1976 deaths
American set decorators
People from North Dakota